The 2017–2018 season will be Željezničar's 97th in existence and their 18th season in Premijer Liga BiH. The team will be competing in three major tournaments, Premijer Liga BiH, Kup BiH and UEFA Europa League. The youth team will also be competing in UEFA Youth League for the second time in three years.

Season review

May
On 29 May, Željezničar and Danijel Stojanović agreed to terminate contract.

June
On 5 June, the club announced new kits for the upcoming season.

On 7 June, Željezničar announced the signing of 22-year-old Dženan Zajmović from Travnik.

On 9 June, Željezničar and Dino Hasanović negotiated a two-year contract extension lasting until May 2019.

On 13 June, Željezničar announced the signing of 23-year-old Asim Zec from Sloboda Tuzla.

On 13 June, Željezničar announced the loan of 23-year-old Daniel Graovac from Belgium club Mouscron.

On 14 June, the club announced promotion of nine home grown players to the first team.

On 18 June, Željezničar announced the signing of 24-year-old Sinan Ramović from Mladost Doboj Kakanj.

July
On 8 July, Željezničar and Lens reached an agreement for the transfer of Ivan Lendrić. On 10 July, the transfer was completed.

On 9 July, Željezničar announced the signing of 29-year-old Josip Projić from Serbian club Napredak Kruševac.

On 23 July, the club appointed 44-year-old Admir Adžem as the new head coach, after releasing Slavko Petrović from his duties.

On 24 July, the club appointed 46-year-old Asmir Džafić as the new assistant head coach.

On 24 July, the club announced that Sanel Jahić's contract would be rescinded.

August
On 1 August, Željezničar and Admiral Casino extended sponsorship agreement.

On 4 August, Željezničar and Sophico signed a sponsorship agreement.

On 8 August, Željezničar and Kemal Osmanković negotiated a three-year contract extension lasting until 2020.

On 9 August, Željezničar negotiated a three-year contract extension lasting until 2021 with youth players Denis Žerić and Ajdin Mujagić.

On 9 August, Željezničar announced the signing of 33-year-old Saša Kajkut from Zrinjski.

On 14 August, Željezničar and Vedran Kjosevski negotiated a three-year contract extension lasting until 2020.

On 16 August, Željezničar and Uglješa Radinović agreed to terminate contract.

September
On 15 September, Željezničar and Lutrija BiH extended sponsorship agreement.

On 16 September, Željezničar and Mikrokreditna fondacija Sunrise extended sponsorship agreement.

On 25 September, the club announced Aldin Čenan is leaving the position as Director of Sports due to health problems.

On 29 September, Željezničar announced the signing of 31-year-old Rok Elsner.

October
On 2 October, Željezničar announced the signing of 29-year-old Vojo Ubiparip.

On 5 October, the club announced promotion of youth players Filip Dujmović and Semir Dacić to the first team.

On 24 October, Željezničar and Haris Hajdarević negotiated a four-year contract extension lasting until 2021.

On 27 October, the club announced youth players Kemal Mujarić, Eldar Šehić and Dženan Osmanović have signed apprenticeship contracts.

November
On 9 November, Željezničar and Adnan Bobić agreed to terminate contract.

On 15 November, the club appointed 37-year-old Saša Papac as the new Director of Sports.

On 21 November, Željezničar and Euroherc osiguranje extended sponsorship agreement.

On 23 November, Željezničar and Sarajevska pivara extended sponsorship agreement.

On 28 November, Željezničar and Stevo Nikolić agreed to terminate contract.

December
On 8 December, Željezničar and Oktal Pharma extended sponsorship agreement.

On 11 December, the club announced changes in management. On 16 December, Senad Misimović was appointed as the new Chairman of the club.

On 18 December, Željezničar and Dženis Beganović agreed to terminate contract.

On 19 December, Željezničar and Centrotrans Eurolines extended sponsorship agreement.

On 21 December, Željezničar and ELPI Comerc extended sponsorship agreement.

On 21 December, Željezničar announced the signing of 25-year-old Adi Mehremić from Austrian club St. Pölten.

On 21 December, Željezničar and Irfan Fejzić negotiated a one and a half-year contract extension lasting until 2019.

On 25 December, Željezničar and Darko Marković agreed to terminate contract.

January
On 5 January, Željezničar and Kristal signed sponsorship agreement.

On 9 January, the club announced an international public call for the submission of bids for the reconstruction of the main pitch of the Grbavica Stadium.

On 10 January, Željezničar and restaurant Slatko i Slano signed sponsorship agreement.

On 11 January, the club announced the signings of Almir Ćubara and Meldin Jusufi.

On 17 January, Željezničar and BiH.ba signed a media partnership agreement.

On 17 January, Željezničar and Mann+Hummel signed a sponsorship agreement.

On 18 January, Željezničar and ASA Osiguranje extended sponsorship agreement.

On 18 January, Željezničar and Dino Hasanović agreed to terminate contract.

On 18 January, the club announced three players will be leaving on loan to Iskra.

On 22 January, Željezničar announced the signing of 23-year-old Kenan Hadžić from Croatian club Istra 1961.

On 23 January, Željezničar announced the signing of 31-year-old Stojan Vranješ from Polish club Piast Gliwice.

On 26 January, Željezničar and Samir Bekrić agreed to terminate contract.

On 26 January, Željezničar announced the signing of 21-year-old Andrej Modić from Italian club Milan.

February
On 2 February, Željezničar and Mark Medical signed sponsorship agreement.

On 12 February, Željezničar and Milkos signed sponsorship agreement.

On 21 February, Željezničar and Hotel Novotel Sarajevo Bristol signed sponsorship agreement.

On 22 February, Željezničar and In Time signed sponsorship agreement.

On 27 February, Željezničar and Dnevni avaz extended media agreement.

March
On 3 March, the club announced Ajdin Mujagić will be leaving on loan to Travnik.

On 9 March, the club announced Sarajevo osiguranje as the new golden sponsor.

On 12 March, Željezničar and Atos osiguranje signed sponsorship agreement.

On 23 March, Željezničar and Adriatic osiguranje signed sponsorship agreement.

On 29 March, Željezničar and Rail Cargo Logistics – BH signed sponsorship agreement.

April
On 4 April, the club announced Ziraat Bank as the new general sponsor.

Squad statistics

Players

 

 

Total squad cost:

Disciplinary record
Includes all competitive matches. The list is sorted by position, and then shirt number.

Goalscorers

Last updated: 19 May 2018

Assists

Last updated: 19 May 2018

Transfers

In 

 

 
 
 
 
 

 
 
 
 
 
 

Total expenditure:

Out 

Total income:  (€300,000)

Club

Coaching staff
{|
|valign="top"|

Other information

Sponsorship

Competitions

Pre-season

Mid-season

Overall

Premijer Liga BiH

Regular season table

Results summary

Results by round

Matches

Championship round table

Results summary

Results by round

Matches

Kup BiH

Round of 32

Round of 16

Quarter-finals

Semi-finals

Finals

UEFA Europa League

First round

Second round

UEFA Youth League

First round

Second round

Play-offs

References

FK Željezničar Sarajevo seasons
Zeljeznicar